The World Group was the highest level of Federation Cup competition in 1993. Thirty-two nations competed in a five-round knockout competition from 19–25 July. Germany was the defending champion, but they were shocked in the first round by Australia, in what was the first time in the event's history where the defending team was defeated without winning a match. The defeat was especially significant as it involved a loss for then singles World No. 1 Steffi Graf at the hands of Nicole Provis. Prior to this match, Graf had defeated Provis in straight at their four meetings, and had never lost a Fed Cup tie.

The Australian team reached the final, but they were defeated by the Spanish team, in what was their third consecutive final.

Participating Teams

Draw

First round

Germany vs. Australia

Austria vs. Denmark

Chile vs. Finland

Colombia vs. Japan

Argentina vs. New Zealand

South Korea vs. Bulgaria

China vs. Peru

Switzerland vs. United States

Czech Republic vs. South Africa

Italy vs. Israel

Sweden vs. Uruguay

Canada vs. France

Netherlands vs. Croatia

Latvia vs. Belgium

Poland vs. Indonesia

Great Britain vs. Spain

Second round

Australia vs. Denmark

Finland vs. Japan

Argentina vs. Bulgaria

China vs. United States

Czech Republic vs. Italy

Sweden vs. France

Netherlands vs. Latvia

Indonesia vs. Spain

Quarterfinals

Australia vs. Finland

Argentina vs. United States

Czech Republic vs. France

Netherlands vs. Spain

Semifinals

Australia vs. Argentina

France vs. Spain

Final

Australia vs. Spain

References

External links
 Fed Cup website

World Group
Tennis tournaments in Germany
Sports competitions in Frankfurt